Lido Beach is a hamlet and census-designated place (CDP) in Nassau County, New York, United States. The population was 2,897 at the 2010 census.

Lido Beach is located in the Town of Hempstead.

Geography

Lido Beach is located at  (40.587988, -73.624624), between Long Beach and Point Lookout.

History

Lido Beach was developed by William H. Reynolds, in the early 1900s. The 39-year-old former state senator and real estate developer had already developed four Brooklyn neighborhoods (Bedford-Stuyvesant, Borough Park, Bensonhurst, and South Brownsville), as well as Coney Island's Dreamland, the world's largest amusement park. Reynolds also owned a theater and produced plays.

Beginning in 1906, he gathered investors and acquired the oceanfront from private owners and the rest of Long Beach island from the Town of Hempstead in 1907; he planned to build a boardwalk, homes, and hotels, and dredged Reynolds Channel to create the Long Beach, New York resort area. The dredging made the island more accessible to leisure boating.

The Lido Beach community was named after a villa in Venice, Italy. In 1929, after Reynolds was defeated for re-election as the Long Beach mayor, he turned his attention to the unincorporated area just east of the city and constructed the Moorish-style Lido Beach Hotel.

Demographics

As of the census of 2010, there were 2,897 people, 1,249 households, and 813 families residing in the CDP. The population density was 1,666.0 per square mile (634.2/km2). (As of 2000,) There were 1,403 housing units at an average density of 806.8/sq mi (297.4/km2). The racial makeup of the CDP was 96.11% White, 0.57% African American, 1.59% Asian, 0.78% from other races, and 0.96% from two or more races. Hispanic or Latino of any race were 2.87% of the population.

There were 1,149 households, out of which 27.5% had children under the age of 18 living with them, 63.4% were married couples living together, 5.6% had a female householder with no husband present, and 29.2% were non-families. 24.6% of all households were made up of individuals, and 13.1% had someone living alone who was 65 years of age or older. The average household size was 2.44 and the average family size was 2.93.

In the CDP, the population was spread out, with 21.8% under the age of 18, 4.3% from 18 to 24, 21.0% from 25 to 44, 31.6% from 45 to 64, and 21.3% who were 65 years of age or older. The median age was 46 years. For every 100 females, there were 97.1 males. For every 100 females age 18 and over, there were 90.2 males.

The median income for a household in the CDP was $86,769, and the median income for a family was $107,365. Males had a median income of $77,193 versus $68,542 for females. The per capita income for the CDP was $47,604. About 1.8% of families and 2.9% of the population were below the poverty line, including none of those under age 18 and 4.3% of those age 65 or over.

Activities, amenities, and attractions
Activities and attractions at Lido Beach include:
 Areas for barbecuing, picnicking, and large gatherings, "with long picnic tables shaded by canopies"
Carts are available for beachgoers to tote their gear (e.g., coolers and chairs) down to the "sandy beach shore"
 Live entertainment: live concerts are held in the parking lot every summer weekday afternoon
 Sports facilities on land: basketball, bocce, handball, shuffleboard, and volleyball courts
 Water sports: "fishing is allowed in the early hours of the day, and special body boarding areas have been designated on the beach". Surfing is not allowed on Lido Beach but is permitted at Lido West. 
  
Children's activities amenities, and attractions include:
 Arts and crafts lessons
 Spray pools
 Storytelling programs

Notable people
(Alphabetized by surname)
Tekashi 6ix9ine, rapper rented a house before his 2018 arrest and after his 2020 release
Lester Bernstein, former editor-in-chief of Newsweek
Carol Burnett and family rented a house in the summer of 1963 in Lido Beach, on Pinehurst Street
 Gregory Hines, dancer, actor, singer, and choreographer owned a weekend home on Luchon Street in the dunes section.
Steve Lawrence and Eydie Gorme lived in Lido Beach for many years
 Rick Rubin, hip hop producer
Debbie Wasserman-Schultz, Democratic politician

In art, entertainment, and media
The movie, Still Alice (2014), was partially filmed in Lido Beach.

The movie The Godfather was partially filmed at the Lido Beach Hotel in 1969. 

The movie Teenage Mother was filmed in Lido Beach and Long Beach in the late 1960s.

The alternative rock band Lido Beach is named after the town. Singer/guitarist Scott Waldman is from Lido and previously played bass for The City Drive.

References

External links

               

Hempstead, New York
Census-designated places in New York (state)
Hamlets in New York (state)
Census-designated places in Nassau County, New York
Hamlets in Nassau County, New York
Populated coastal places in New York (state)